Jung Han-yong (정한용, born June 22, 1954) is a veteran South Korean actor. He has appeared in many television series, including 2009's Iris. In 1983 he won the Baeksang Arts Awards for Best New Actor for his performance in the series Ordinary People (보통 사람들, Botong saramdeul). He appeared in more than 50 television series and movies between 1980 and 2013.

Theater 
 The Playboy of the Western World (2022) - Director

References

1954 births
Living people
New York University alumni
Sogang University alumni
South Korean male television actors
South Korean male film actors
Best New Actor Paeksang Arts Award (television) winners